Insulin-like 3 is a protein that in humans is encoded by the INSL3 gene.

Function 

The protein encoded by this gene is an insulin like hormone produced mainly in gonadal tissues in males and females. Studies of the mouse counterpart suggest that this gene may be involved in the development of urogenital tract and female fertility. INSL-3 initiates meiotic progression in follicle-enclosed oocytes by mediating a reduction in intra-oocyte cAMP concentration by activating leucine-rich repeat-containing G protein-coupled receptor 8 (LGR8). It may also act as a hormone to regulate growth and differentiation of gubernaculum, and thus mediating intra-abdominal testicular descent. The mutations in this gene may lead to, but not a frequent cause of, cryptorchidism.

References

Further reading